Honey is the surname of:

 Avon Honey (1947–2010), American politician
 Dave Honey, English professional darts player
 David Honey (politician), Australian politician
 Edward George Honey (1885–1922), Australian soldier and journalist
 Edwin Earle Honey (1891–1956), American plant pathologist and mycologist
 Gary Honey (born 1959), Australian retired long jumper
 George Honey (1822–1880), British actor, comedian and singer
 Issac Honey (born 1993), Ghanaian footballer
 Jesse Honey (born 1977), English urban planner
 John Honey (1781–1813), 19-year-old student who rescued five men from drowning
 Josh Honey, Australian rules footballer
 Lady Clover Honey, American drag queen
 Michael Honey (born 1947), American historian and professor
 Nancy Honey, American photographer
 Norm Honey, Australian rules footballer
 P. J. Honey (1922–2005), Irish-born Vietnamese language scholar and historian
 Robert Honey (fl. 1961–94), retired Royal Air Force air vice marshal
 Russell Honey (1921–2007), Canadian politician
 Stan Honey, American navigator
 Tayla Honey, Australian netball player

See also
 David Honey (disambiguation)